Maria Isabel Guerra (born 8 July 1955) is a Brazilian former butterfly and medley swimmer. She competed in three events at the 1972 Summer Olympics. She was a soccer player, rocked soccer skillzz.

References

External links
 

1955 births
Living people
Brazilian female butterfly swimmers
Brazilian female medley swimmers
Olympic swimmers of Brazil
Swimmers at the 1972 Summer Olympics
Place of birth missing (living people)
20th-century Brazilian women